Yu-Gi-Oh! Zexal (遊☆戯☆王 ZEXAL (ゼアル) Yūgiō Zearu) is the fourth Yu-Gi-Oh! anime television series by Nihon Ad Systems and TV Tokyo. It is directed by Satoshi Kuwahara and produced by Studio Gallop. The series aired in Japan on TV Tokyo between April 11, 2011 and September 24, 2012. A second series, Yu-Gi-Oh! Zexal II, began airing from October 7, 2012. The show also premiered on Toonzai in North America on October 15, 2011. The story follows the young duelist Yuma Tsukumo who partners up with an ethereal spirit named Astral, as they search for the 100 Number Duel Monsters cards, which will restore Astral's memories.

Six pieces of theme music are used for the series: three opening and three ending themes. For episodes 1–25, the opening theme is "Masterpiece" (マスターピース Masutāpīsu?) by mihimaru GT while the ending theme is "My Quest" (僕クエスト Boku Kuesuto?) by Golden Bomber.[1] For episode 26–49, the opening theme is "Braving!" (ブレイビング! Bureibingu!?) by Kanan while the ending theme is "Freesia of Longing" (切望のフリージア Setsubō no Furījia?) by DaizyStripper. For episodes 50–73, the opening theme is "Soul Drive" (魂ドライブ Tamashī Doraibu?) by Color Bottle while the ending theme is "Wild Child" (ワイルドチャイルド Wairudo Chairudo?) by Moumoon. For the 4Kids and Konami English dub versions, the opening theme is "Take a Chance" for all episodes.


Episode list

References

Zexal I (season 1)
2011 Japanese television seasons